Musaabad (also Romanized as Mūsáābād; also known as Mūsīābād) is a village in Shohada Rural District, in the Central District of Meybod County, Yazd Province, Iran. At the 2006 census, its population was 44, in 14 families.

References 

Populated places in Meybod County